Cameron Hunt (born December 17, 1994) is an American football guard for the Arlington Renegades of the XFL. He played college football at Oregon.

Early years
Hunt attended Centennial High School in Corona, California, where he played varsity baseball and football. He played both as an offensive and defensive lineman. He was described as "the best offensive lineman" ever at his high school, and was named the a USA Today 2nd team All-American and Los Angeles Times Lineman of the Year for his senior 2012 season, when he helped lead his team to a 14–2 record and a playoff berth. Hunt initially committed to California on July 8, 2012, but switched his commitment to Oregon on February 6, 2013, choosing the Ducks over California, Oregon State, UCLA, Michigan, and Nebraska.

College career

Freshman season (2013)
Hunt started the last seven games of Oregon's 2013 season, becoming the team's first true freshman starter on the offensive line since 1997, although he had some playing time in all 13 games. He debuted at the right tackle position against Washington State, but switched to right guard for the rest of the season.

Sophomore season (2014)
Hunt continued to play a key role in Oregon's young offensive line, as he was the most experienced offensive lineman remaining at Oregon. He helped lead the Ducks to the 2015 College Football Playoff National Championship, a loss to Ohio State.

Junior season (2015)
Hunt started all games except that against Georgia State.

Senior season (2016)
Hunt started all 12 games at the right guard position, and received the Ed Moshofsky Trophy for the Team's Outstanding Offensive Lineman. He also received the Pancake Club Award for the Most Pancake Blocks.

Professional career

Denver Broncos
Hunt went undrafted in the 2017 NFL Draft, and signed with the Denver Broncos as an undrafted free agent on May 12, 2017. He was waived by the team on September 2, 2017.

San Francisco 49ers
Hunt was signed to the San Francisco 49ers practice squad on November 14, 2017.

Oakland Raiders
Hunt was signed by the Oakland Raiders on May 17, 2018. He was waived on September 1, 2018. He was re-signed to the active roster on December 11, 2018.

Hunt was waived on April 30, 2019, but was re-signed on August 17, 2019. He was waived/injured during final roster cuts on August 30, 2019, and reverted to the team's injured reserve list on September 1.

Birmingham Stallions
Hunt was drafted by the Birmingham Stallions in the 2022 USFL Draft.

Los Angeles Chargers
On August 8, 2022, Hunt signed with the Los Angeles Chargers. He was waived on August 22.

Arlington Renegades 
On November 17, 2022, Hunt was drafted by the Arlington Renegades of the XFL.

References

External links
Las Vegas Raiders bio

1994 births
Living people
American football offensive guards
Arlington Renegades players
Birmingham Stallions (2022) players
Denver Broncos players
Los Angeles Chargers players
Oakland Raiders players
Oregon Ducks football players
Players of American football from California
San Francisco 49ers players
Sportspeople from Corona, California